The Val Verde Hotel, at 203 Manzanares St. in Socorro, New Mexico, was built in 1919.  It was listed on the National Register of Historic Places in 1977.

It is a  U-shaped building, built of yellow concrete brick.  It was designed in Mission Revival/Spanish Revival style, probably by architects Trost & Trost .

References

National Register of Historic Places in Socorro County, New Mexico
Mission Revival architecture in New Mexico
Buildings and structures completed in 1919